Cristian Rodrigo Leiva Godoy (born 3 March 1976), nicknamed Flaco (Skinny), is a Chilean football manager and former footballer who played as a defender.

Club career
Leiva began his professional career with Universidad de Chile, staying only two years at the club. Along with La U, he played the last minutes in a 1996 Copa Libertadores match against Barcelona de Guayaquil at the quarter-finals. After he was on loan to Deportes Iquique, he played for several clubs in Chile, being his greatest achievement to become runner-up of the 2005 Torneo Apertura with Coquimbo Unido, after losing the final against Unión Española.

Managerial career
On 2011, Leiva began his managerial career at the youth categories of Universidad de Chile and Jorge Sampaoli, manager of La U, gave him in charge of the "sparring team". 

From 2012 to 2019 - with the managers Jorge Sampaoli, Juan Antonio Pizzi and Reinaldo Rueda - he worked in the technical staff of Chile national team as a video and report assistant and Chile U15's manager (from 2017 to 2019). At this term, he was known as a "spy" by watching slyly the Chile's opponents.  After Hernán Caputto left Chile U17, on 9 July 2019 he was confirmed as the new manager for the 2019 FIFA U-17 World Cup, where Chile U17 reached the second stage. At the same time, he also worked as assistant coach of Bernardo Redín in Chile U23 in both 2019 Maurice Revello Tournament and 2020 Pre-Olympic Tournament.

On 2020, he took his first challenge at the Chilean Primera División by assuming the management of Deportes Iquique.

References

External links
 
 
 Cristian Leiva at BDFA
 Cristian Leiva at CeroaCero

1976 births
Living people
People from Petorca Province
People from Valparaíso Region
Chilean footballers
Chilean Primera División players
Primera B de Chile players
Universidad de Chile footballers
Deportes Iquique footballers
Unión San Felipe footballers
Unión Española footballers
Coquimbo Unido footballers
C.D. Huachipato footballers
C.D. Antofagasta footballers
Association football defenders
Chilean football managers
Chilean Primera División managers
Primera B de Chile managers
Deportes Iquique managers